Sam Franklin may refer to:

Sam Franklin (soccer), American soccer player
Sam Franklin (American football) (born 1996), American football safety